ONE: Lights Out was a Combat sport event produced by ONE Championship that took place on March 11, 2022, at the Singapore Indoor Stadium in Kallang, Singapore.

Background
A ONE Featherweight Championship title bout between champion Thanh Le and title challenger Garry Tonon was scheduled as the main event.

ONE Bantamweight World Champion Bibiano Fernandes defends his belt against top-ranked contender John Lineker, and newly crowned ONE Strawweight Muay Thai World Champion Prajanchai PK.Saenchai makes his first title defense against #3-ranked Joseph Lasiri. after Lasiri Withdraw because of injury during training, Prajanchai vs Lasiri to cancelled and moved to ONE 157

Kirill Gorobets will make his promotional debut against former two-division ONE world champion Martin Nguyen.

Results

Bonus awards
The following fighters received $50,000 bonuses.

 Performance of the Night: Thanh Le, John Lineker, Zhang Peimain, Iman Barlow and Liam Nolan

See also 

 2022 in ONE Championship
 List of ONE Championship events
 List of current ONE fighters

References 

Events in Singapore
ONE Championship events
2022 in mixed martial arts
Mixed martial arts in Singapore
Sports competitions in Singapore
March 2022 sports events in Singapore